The 2014 European Junior Cup was the fourth season of the European Junior Cup. It was contested over eight rounds, starting on 13 April at Motorland Aragón and ending on 5 October at Magny Cours.

Spanish rider Augusto Fernández won the championship, taking four wins during the season, as well as finishing every race in the top six placings. Fernández clinched the championship with a third-place finish in the final race, taking him out of reach of compatriot Javier Orellana, who won the race – his second of the season, after Donington Park – by a tally of fifteen points. Angelo Licciardi completed the top three placings, just a point ahead of another Spanish rider, Illán Fernández. The only other riders to win races during the season were Josh Harland at Jerez and Marc Miralles, who won the opening race at Motorland Aragón.

Entry list
Defending champion Jake Lewis moved to the European Superstock 600 Championship, while the series featured two female riders – Clarissa Miebach of Germany and Carmen Geissler of Switzerland.

Race calendar and results

Championship standings

External links
 

2014 in motorcycle sport
Junior